Tokuko Ushioda (潮田登久子, Ushioda Tokuko, b. 1940) is a Japanese photographer whose Bibliotecha series won the Domon Ken Award, the Photographic Society of Japan’s Lifetime Achievement Award, and the Higashikawa International Photo Festival's Domestic Photographer Award in 2018.

Ushioda has works in the collections of Smith College Museum of Art in Massachusetts; Mead Art Museum of Amherst College, Kyushu Sangyō University, Fukuoka, Japan; the National Museum of Modern Art, Tokyo, Japan; Tokyo Photographic Art Museum, Tokyo, Japan; Ken Domon Museum of Photography, Yamagata, Japan; and Higashikawa Town, Hokkaido, Japan.

Career 
Ushioda was born in Tokyo, Japan, in 1940.

She studied under Ōtsuji Kiyoji at Kuwasawa Design School and graduated in 1963. She also studied under Yasuhiro Ishimoto. She has worked as a freelance photographer since 1975, and taught at Kuwasawa Design School and Tokyo Zōkei University from 1966-1978. She married photographer Shinzō Shimao in 1978, and their daughter is the manga artist and illustrator Maho Shimao.

Ushioda is perhaps best known for her series Bibliotecha (Hon no keshiki, 本の景色), for which she photographed books as valid art objects in 1995. She published the photobook Bibliotecha in 2017, dividing the images into 26 chapters that show books beyond their presence as mere physical objects.

Ushioda is also known for her series ICE BOX (Reizōko, 冷蔵庫), in which she photographed the contents of various families' refrigerators. She published the photobook ICE BOX in 1996, depicting compositions of many refrigerators captured open with the contents inside, or closed from the front, as well as in various settings within the households.

Her series My Husband (Mai hazubando, マイハズバンド) "chronicles Ushioda’s family life and artistic growth" during the 1970s. The artist found the prints forty years later in March 2020, leading to the publication of a two-part photobook in 2022.

External Links 

 Artist website: http://www.usimaoda.com/

Publications 

 My Husband, Torch Press, 2022
 BIBLIOTHECA, Genkishobou, 2017
 My Teacher’s Atelier, Genkishobou 2017
 Misuzu, Genkishobou, 2016
 HATS, Parol, 2004
 ICE BOX, Beebooks, 1996
 Chinese People, Self-published, 1986

Awards 

 2019 Kuwasawa Special Award
 2018 The 37th Domon Ken Award
 2018 Lifetime Achievement Award, Photographic Society of Japan Awards
 2018 Domestic Photographer Award, The 34th Higashikawa Awards

Exhibition History

Selected Solo Exhibitions 

 2018 Domon Ken Award Winner's Exhibition, BIBLIOTHECA, Ken Domon Museum of Photography (Yamagata)
 2018 Domon Ken Award Winner's Exhibition, BIBLIOTHECA, The Gallery, Nikon Plaza (Shinjuku, Osaka)
 2017 BIBLIOTHECA, PGI, Tokyo
 2017 BIBLIOTHECA, Galerie 412, Tokyo
 2010 BIBLIOTHECA, Morioka Shoten, Tokyo
 2009 ICE BOX, CAFÉ UNIZON, Okinawa
 2008 ICE BOX, Port Gallery T, Osaka
 2006 BIBLIOTHECA, Imbrie Hall Meiji Gakuin University, Tokyo
 2004 Bookmart, Contemporary Photo Gallery, Tokyo
 2003 BIBLIOTHECA, Waseda University Library, Tokyo
 2003 BIBLIOTHECA, Contemporary Photo Gallery, Tokyo
 2003 BIBLIOTHECA, The 5th Library Fair at Tokyo International Forum
 2002 Seika/Sacred Song, Contemporary Photo Gallery, Tokyo
 2001 HATS, Contemporary Photo Gallery, Tokyo
 1999 ICE BOX, Setagaya Lifestyle Design Center, Tokyo
 1998 ICE BOX, Art Gallery Artium, Tokyo
 1994 HATS, Gallery MOLE, Tokyo
 1992 ICE BOX, Tokyo Design Center, Tokyo
 1989 Seikatsu/LIFE, Film Round Gallery, Tokyo
 1976 Hohoemi no tejo/Smile was handcuffed, Shinjuku Nikon Salon, Tokyo

Selected Group Exhibitions 

 2022 From Student to Master: Tokuko Ushioda and Her Teachers, Alison Bradley Projects, New York 
 2021 Anneke Hymmen & Kumi Hiroi, Tokuko Ushioda, Mari Katayama, Maiko Haruki, Mayumi Hosokura, and Your Perspectives, Shiseido Gallery, Tokyo
 2019 A Bright Home, Hiroshima City Museum of Contemporary Art, Hiroshima 
 2018 The Higashikawa Awards, Award Winning Exhibition, Higashikawa Bunka Gallery, Hokkaido
 2018 The Photographic Society of Japan Awards, Winner’s Exhibition, Fujifilm Square, Tokyo
 2018 A Moveable Feast, Xian Memories Museum, Xian, China 
 2016 Dislocations, Smith College Museum of Art, Northampton, MA 
 2015 The Kaji House, Hayama, Kanagawa 
 2012 Reinventing Tokyo, Mead Art Museum, Amherst College, Amherst, MA 
 2008 China/Bibliotheca/Manga, Lee Ka-sing Gallery, Toront, Canada 
 2004 Maho-chan-chi (Maho-chan’s Lovely Home), Contemporary Art Gallery, Art Tower Mito, Ibaraki
 1995 Tokyo/City of Photo, Tokyo Metropolitan Museum of Photography, Tokyo 
 1989 6・un・expressionism, FROG, Tokyo 
 1982 China Life Report, Polaroid Gallery, Tokyo 
 1981 Jinwa Jinminkosha, OWL, Tokyo

References 

Japanese photographers
Japanese women photographers
Living people
1940 births